Gore High School is one of two secondary schools in Gore, New Zealand, the other being St Peter's College, Gore. It is located on Coutts Road in the west of Gore.

Notable staff
Johnny Borland – high jumper, athletics official
George Jobberns – geographer, university professor
James Ernest Strachan – school principal

Notable alumni

Aaron Barclay (born 1992), triathlete
Todd Barclay (born 1990), Member of Parliament for Clutha-Southland
Jimmy Cowan (born 1982), former Highlanders and All Blacks half back
Amanda Hooper (née Christie, 1980–2011), professional field hockey player
Justin Marshall (born 1973), former Crusaders and All Black Half Back
Marty McKenzie (born 1992), current Chiefs, Taranaki and New Zealand Maori All Blacks First-Five
Penny Simmonds, Member of Parliament for Invercargill

References

Secondary schools in Southland, New Zealand
Boarding schools in New Zealand
Gore, New Zealand